Skënder Begeja (5 February 1924 - 3 October 2010) was a former Albanian football forward. He made four appearances for the Albania national team.

Club career
Begeja studied at the Qemal Stafa High School, in Tirana, Albania. He was the first Albanian athlete to run the 100 meters under 11 seconds.

During his football career Begeja played for Shprefeja (1942–1945), Bulgarian Akademik Sofia (1948–50) and Dinamo Tirana (1952–58).

International career
He made his debut for Albania in a May 1947 Balkan Cup match against Romania and earned a total of 4 caps, scoring no goals. His final international was a September 1947 Balkan Cup match against Yugoslavia.

Personal life
After retiring as a player in 1958, Begeja worked as a reserve team coach with Dinamo and was deputy to head coach Skënder Jareci. He also worked for the FSHF and the Albanian Olympic committee. He died on 3 October 2010, aged 86.

Honours

Dinamo Tirana 

Kategoria Superiore (6): 1950, 1951, 1952, 1953, 1955, 1956.
Kupa e Shqipërisë (3): 1952, 1953, 1954.

References

1924 births
2010 deaths
Footballers from Tirana
Albanian footballers
Association football forwards
Albania international footballers
Shprefeja players
Akademik Sofia players
FK Dinamo Tirana players
First Professional Football League (Bulgaria) players
Albanian expatriate footballers
Expatriate footballers in Bulgaria
Albanian expatriate sportspeople in Bulgaria
Qemal Stafa High School alumni
Albanian male sprinters